Xiao Zhao (Hsiao Chao) was a Chinese painter active from 1130 to 1162, from Hu-tse, Shanxi.  He was a pupil of Li Tang.

A crater on Mercury is named after him.

Gallery

References

12th-century births
12th-century deaths
12th-century Chinese painters